Raba'al-Abs is a sub-district located in Bilad Ar Rus District, Sana'a Governorate, Yemen. Raba'al-Abs had a population of 10229 according to the 2004 census.

References 

Sub-districts in Bilad Ar Rus District